Montechiarugolo is a comune (municipality) in the Province of Parma in the Italian region Emilia-Romagna, located about  northwest of Bologna and about  southeast of Parma.

Montechiarugolo borders the following municipalities: Montecchio Emilia, Parma, San Polo d'Enza, Sant'Ilario d'Enza, Traversetolo.

Twin towns
 Izola, Slovenia

See also
County of Montechiarugolo

References

External links
 www.comune.montechiarugolo.pr.it